Tamiyo Taga is a leader of Bharatiya Janata Party from Arunachal Pradesh, India. He is a member of Arunachal Pradesh Legislative Assembly elected from Rumgong in West Siang district.

He was leader of opposition in Arunachal Legislative Assembly.

On 14-Oct-2016, Pema Khandu, Chief Minister of Arunachal Pradesh, formally joined hands with Bharatiya Janata Party, making Arunachal Pradesh 14th state to have BJP in power, and with this new coalition, Tamiyo Taga was sworn in as Cabinet minister of Arunachal Pradesh.

See also
 Arunachal Pradesh Legislative Assembly

References

Arunachal Pradesh MLAs 2009–2014
People from West Siang district
Living people
Leaders of the Opposition in Arunachal Pradesh
Year of birth missing (living people)
Arunachal Pradesh MLAs 2014–2019
State cabinet ministers of Arunachal Pradesh
Indian National Congress politicians
Janata Dal politicians
Bharatiya Janata Party politicians from Arunachal Pradesh